Hornitos is a Spanish term meaning "little ovens". It may refer to any of the following:

Settlements 
 Hornitos, California
 Hornitos, Chile

Other 
 Hornitos, a brand of tequila produced by Sauza Tequila
 Hornito, volcanic landform